The Rainbow Alliance is a political alliance in Togo.

History
The alliance was formed in 2012 by the Action Committee for Renewal (which held four seats in the National Assembly), the Democratic Convention of African Peoples, the Union of Socialist Democrats, the Pan-African Democratic Party the Citizens' Movement for Democracy and Development and New Togolese Commitment. In the 2013 parliamentary elections it received 11% of the vote, winning six of the 91 seats in the National Assembly.

Election results

Parliamentary election

References

Political party alliances in Togo
Political parties established in 2012
2012 establishments in Togo